Bekir Pakdemirli (born 1973) is a Turkish businessman and former Minister of Agriculture and Forestry.

Early years
Bekir Pakdemirli was born at İzmir, Turkey in 1973. His father Ekrem Pakdemirli was a politician, who briefly served as a Deputy Prime Minister in 1991. He studied Business administration at Bilkent University. After receiving his bachelor's degree, he continued his education at Başkent University graduating with a Master of Business Administration title. Later, he earned a doctoral degree from Celal Bayar University.

Career
After completion of his education, Pakdemirli worked as an entrepreneur in the fields of food, agriculture, animal husbandry, technology and automotive. He co-founded and managed various companies. He served as general manager of a major company and a publicly-held food corporation. Following his senior management position in an international food company, he also worked as a consultant in the same company. He was a board member at the mobile network operator Turkcell, the discount store chain BİM and the bank Albaraka Türk.

Between 2018 and 2022, Pakdemirli served as minister of Agriculture and Forestry in the Fourth cabinet of Erdoğan.

Private life
In his private life, Pakdemirli was active in social responsibility projects holding posts in a number of associations and foundations. He owns licenses of sea captain, aprivate aviation pilot and amateur radio operator.

References

Living people
1973 births
People from İzmir
Bilkent University alumni
Başkent University alumni
Manisa Celal Bayar University alumni
Turkish businesspeople
Government ministers of Turkey
Ministers of Agriculture and Forestry of Turkey
Members of the 66th government of Turkey